Lamontichthys maracaibero is a species of armored catfish endemic to Venezuela where it occurs in the Lake Maracaibo basin.  This species grows to a length of  SL.

References 
 

Harttiini
Fish of Venezuela
Endemic fauna of Venezuela
Taxa named by Donald Charles Taphorn Baechle
Taxa named by Craig Gustav Lilyestrom
Fish described in 1984